Eucalyptus conglomerata, commonly known as the swamp stringybark, is a species of straggly tree or mallee that is endemic to Queensland. It has rough, fibrous "stringybark" lance-shaped to oblong adult leaves, flower buds in groups of eleven or more, white flowers and more or less barrel-shaped fruit.

Description
It has greyish brown, fibrous stringybark over the trunk and most of the branches, sometimes smooth bark on the thinnest branches. Flowering occurs between April and August and the flowers are white.

Taxonomy and naming
Eucalyptus conglomerata was first formally described in 1929 by Joseph Maiden and William Blakely and the description was published in Maiden's book A Critical Revision of the Genus Eucalyptus. The specific epithet (conglomerata) is a Latin word meaning "roll together", "crowd", "concentrated", referring to the clustered fruit of this species.

Distribution and habitat
Swamp stringybark grows in damp, sandy soil, near creeks and swamps, often at the edges of heath. It occurs on the Sunshine Coast between Beerwah and Kin Kin.

Conservation status
This eucalypt is classified as "endangered" under the Australian Government Environment Protection and Biodiversity Conservation Act 1999 and under the Queensland Government Nature Conservation Act 1992. The main threats to the species are land clearing, drainage works, urban development and road construction.

See also
List of Eucalyptus species

References

conglomerata
Flora of Queensland
Endangered flora of Australia
Myrtales of Australia
Taxa named by William Blakely
Taxa named by Joseph Maiden
Plants described in 1929